This is a list of public holidays in San Marino.

Official holidays

Public holidays and festivals

References

Events in San Marino
San Marino
San Marino